The Missimer Wildflower Preserve is a protected grassland in Napa County, California owned by the Land Trust of Napa County. The preserve is situated on considerable serpentine soil, leading to specially adapted native plants. Situated within Snell Valley, the preserve is noted for its biodiversity of flora. An example of native wildflowers in the Snell Creek watershed is yellow mariposa lily, Calochortus luteus.

See also
 Snell Creek
 Category: Native grasses of California
 List of protected grasslands of North America

References

External links

Grasslands of California
Protected areas of Napa County, California
Parks in the San Francisco Bay Area
Nature reserves in California